"Baby Pluto" is a song by American rapper Lil Uzi Vert. It was released on March 6, 2020, as the first track on their second studio album Eternal Atake. The track peaked at number six on the Billboard Hot 100.

Music video 
An official lyric video was released on May 2, 2020. The entire video is in claymation, which was made and directed by artist Zac Matias, also known online as Lonewolf.

Critical reception 
The track received generally positive reviews. Kyann-Sian Williams of NME called the instrumental of the track "clashing". Will Schube of Complex called the lines on the track "stellar". Dylan Green of DJBooth said the track sounded like "a chandelier covered in baguettes gleaming from the inside of a UFO".

Commercial performance 
The track debuted at number six on the Billboard Hot 100, making it the second highest-charting track (behind "Futsal Shuffle 2020" at number five).

Charts

Certifications

References 

2020 songs
Animated music videos
Lil Uzi Vert songs
Songs written by Lil Uzi Vert